Amanda Michelle Seyfried (born December 3, 1985) is an American actress. Born and raised in Allentown, Pennsylvania, she began modeling at age 11 and ventured into acting at 15, with recurring roles as Lucy Montgomery on the CBS soap opera As the World Turns (1999–2001) and Joni Stafford on the ABC soap opera All My Children (2003). She came to prominence for her feature film debut in the teen comedy Mean Girls (2004), and her recurring roles as Lilly Kane on the CW/Hulu television series Veronica Mars (2004–2006) and Sarah Henrickson on the HBO drama series Big Love (2006–2011).

Seyfried has appeared in a number of films, including Mamma Mia! (2008) and its sequel Mamma Mia! Here We Go Again (2018), Jennifer's Body (2009), Dear John (2010), Letters to Juliet (2010), Red Riding Hood (2011), In Time (2011), Les Misérables (2012), A Million Ways to Die in the West (2014), Ted 2 (2015), and First Reformed (2017).

She received critical acclaim for her portrayal of Marion Davies in David Fincher's biopic Mank (2020), earning nominations for the Academy Award and Golden Globe Award for Best Supporting Actress. For her starring role as Elizabeth Holmes in the drama miniseries The Dropout (2022), she won a Golden Globe and Primetime Emmy Award for Outstanding Lead Actress. Time named her one of the 100 most influential people in the world in 2022.

Early life and education
Amanda Michelle Seyfried was born on December 3, 1985, in Allentown, Pennsylvania. Her mother, Ann Seyfried (née Sander) is an occupational therapist, and her father, Jack Seyfried, is a pharmacist. She is of mostly German descent with smaller amounts of English, Scots-Irish, and Welsh ancestry. She has an older sister, Jennifer Seyfried, who is a musician in the Philadelphia rock band Love City.

Seyfried attended William Allen High School in Allentown, graduating in 2003.  She subsequently enrolled at Fordham University in New York City in the fall of 2003, but chose not to attend after being offered a role in the 2004 film Mean Girls.

Career

1996–2005: Early work
While attending William Allen High School in Allentown, Pennsylvania, Seyfried began modeling. She appeared in several print ads for clothing companies, including Limited Too with Leighton Meester, and was featured on three covers of the Sweet Valley High novel series. At age 17 she stopped modeling and started a job as a waitress in a retirement community. While still a teen, she took vocal lessons, studied opera, trained with a Broadway coach, and began her acting career as an extra in Guiding Light, a daytime television drama. From 2000 to 2001 she played the recurring character Lucy Montgomery on the CBS soap opera As the World Turns and, from 2002 to 2003, Joni Stafford on the ABC soap All My Children.

In 2003, Seyfried auditioned to play Regina George in Mean Girls, but the role eventually went to Rachel McAdams. While she was initially considered for the lead role of Cady Heron, ultimately played by Lindsay Lohan, the film's producers decided that Seyfried should play Karen Smith, Regina's dim-witted "plastic" friend and sidekick. The film was a box office success, grossing over $130 million in its theatrical run. Seyfried's performance in the film earned her, along with Lohan, Lacey Chabert, and McAdams, an MTV Movie Award in the category of "Best On-Screen Team". 

Seyfried then auditioned to play the title character on UPN's television series Veronica Mars. The role eventually went to Kristen Bell, and Seyfried portrayed Veronica's murdered best friend Lilly Kane. Her character was only shown in flashbacks. In 2005, she played the lead character Samantha, a role written by director Rodrigo García specifically for her, in one of the nine parts of the film Nine Lives, composed of nine short films with different themes and an ensemble cast. For her performance, Seyfried, along with the film's other female leads, won the role Best Actress at the Locarno International Film Festival. That year, she played the supporting character Mouse in the independent film American Gun. In 2006, she appeared in five episodes of Wildfire as Rebecca and played the lead role Chrissy in the short film Gypsies, Tramps & Thieves, written and directed by Andrea Janakas. She also contributed in a minor role as Julie Beckley in Alpha Dog. From 2004 to 2006, she made multiple guest appearances on several television series, including House, Justice, Law & Order: Special Victims Unit, American Dad! and CSI: Crime Scene Investigation.

2006–2010: Breakthrough

With her role in the HBO drama television series Big Love, Seyfried's profile as an actress grew substantially; the series centered on a fictional fundamentalist Mormon family in which Seyfried plays Sarah Henrickson, Bill and Barb's first daughter, who struggles with her family's polygamous faith. Big Love premiered in the United States on March 12, 2006. In December 2009, HBO confirmed that Seyfried would return for the show's fourth season, but that it would be her last since she wished to begin concentrating on her film career and other upcoming projects.

Following Big Love, Seyfried played a supporting role, as Zoe, in the 2008 horror drama film Solstice and co-starred with Meryl Streep in Mamma Mia!, a romantic comedy film adaptation of the 1999 musical of the same name. Mamma Mia!, which was Seyfried's first leading role, was the fifth highest-grossing film of 2008, and, as of February 2021, the 159th highest-grossing film of all time. Five songs from her musical performance in Mamma Mia! were released on the film's soundtrack. As part of promotion for both the film and its soundtrack, Seyfried recorded a music video of the song "Gimme! Gimme! Gimme! (A Man After Midnight)".

In March 2008, Seyfried was cast in the comedy horror film Jennifer's Body as Anita "Needy" Lesnicki, the title character's best friend. The film, which premiered at the 2009 Toronto International Film Festival and was released to theaters on September 18, 2009, received mixed reviews from critics. The same year she was cast in the comedy drama independent film Boogie Woogie. She played Paige Oppenheimer, one of the lead roles in the ensemble movie. The movie was originally shown on June 26, 2009, at Edinburgh International Film Festival, and was shown in US theaters April 25, 2010. On February 22, 2009, Seyfried presented an award and performed at the 81st Academy Awards ceremony. In early March 2009, director Zack Snyder had tapped Seyfried to portray the lead role, Baby Doll, in Sucker Punch, but Seyfried had to drop out of the film due to scheduling conflicts with Big Love.

Seyfried starred alongside Channing Tatum in Dear John, the film adaptation of the novel of the same name that was written by Nicholas Sparks. The film, which was released February 5, 2010, received generally negative reviews. Seyfried wrote and recorded "Little House", a song on one of the soundtracks of Dear John. Kirk Honeycutt of The Hollywood Reporter wrote, "Seyfried gives the character and her relationship all she's got, but she can't do all the heavy lifting. The romance is too one-sided, and frankly, you can't blame her for steering her life into another channel." Despite the negative reviews, Dear John became the first film to break up Avatars box office reign at number one at the United States box office, grossing $80 million in the U.S. theatrically and $115 million worldwide.

Seyfried next appeared as the title character in the erotic thriller Chloe, released by Sony Pictures Classics on March 26, 2010. Chloe premiered at the Toronto International Film Festival in September 2009. In the film, Seyfried's character is an escort who is hired to test a husband's faithfulness after his wife concludes that his fidelity could not be trusted. Chloe enjoyed commercial success and became director Atom Egoyan's highest-grossing film. Seyfried's performance in the film received favorable reviews from critics, helping her gain industry acclaim and additional opportunities to play varied roles.

Later in 2010, Seyfried starred in the romantic-comedy film Letters to Juliet, based on the book by Lise and Ceil Friedman. Letters to Juliet was released to mixed reviews but was a box office success, grossing $80 million worldwide. For her performance, Seyfried was awarded "Showest Breakthrough Female Star of The Year". She also won the "Scared-As-S**T" award for her performance in Jennifer's Body and was nominated for Best Female Performance for her movie Dear John, at the 2010 MTV Movie Awards. Also in 2010, Seyfried was named to Forbes "17 Stars To Watch" list, and received three Teen Choice Award nominations, including for Choice Movie Actress Drama and Choice Movie Chemistry with her co-star Channing Tatum for roles in Dear John. Seyfried was also nominated for Choice Movie Actress Romantic Comedy for Letters to Juliet.

2011–present: Further film appearances

In late January 2009, Seyfried was to appear in Myriad Pictures' adaptation of Oscar Wilde's comedy A Woman of No Importance. The film, which was scheduled for a 2011 release, encountered financing impediments. In 2009, she was set to star in the film Albert Nobbs but withdrew from the film because of scheduling conflicts; her role ended up being played by Mia Wasikowska. Seyfried next starred in Catherine Hardwicke's Red Riding Hood, playing the lead role of Valerie. The film was released on March 11, 2011 to mostly negative reviews, but earned $90 million worldwide on a $42 million budget. She also played the lead role of Sylvia Weis in Andrew Niccol's In Time, which reunited her with Alpha Dog co-star Justin Timberlake; In Time was released in October 2011 to mixed reviews but grossed in excess of $172 million worldwide. Also in 2011, Seyfried became a spokesperson and model for Cle de Peau Beaute, a line of Japanese beauty products.

Seyfried starred in the thriller Gone, released in early 2012. Later that year, she played Cosette in the film adaptation of the musical Les Misérables. The film, and her performance, received acclaim from critics, and was nominated for an Academy Award for Best Picture and grossed a total of $440 million worldwide.

In 2013, Seyfried had a voice role in the comedy The Big Wedding and in the animated movie Epic. She played Linda Lovelace in the biopic Lovelace, earning critical acclaim from film critics for her role in it. She appeared in the 2013 drama The End of Love. She was also signed to play the role of Ann Burden in the dramatization of the Robert O'Brien post-apocalyptic novel Z for Zachariah, but was replaced by Margot Robbie following a delay in the film's production. In 2013, she became the face of Givenchy.

In 2015, she appeared in the comedy Ted 2, alongside Mark Wahlberg and Seth MacFarlane, and played Peter Pan's mother in the film Pan. In 2018, she starred as Anon, a futuristic visual hacker, in the Netflix original film Anon, with Clive Owen; and reprised her role as Sophie Sheridan in the Mamma Mia! sequel, Mamma Mia! Here We Go Again, which was released in July. In 2019, Seyfried starred as Eve in The Art of Racing in the Rain, a comedy drama based on best selling book of the same name.

In 2020, Seyfried provided the voice of Daphne Blake in the film Scoob! She also starred in the psychological horror You Should Have Left, opposite Kevin Bacon and directed by David Koepp. She received critical acclaim for her third film of the year, playing actress Marion Davies in David Fincher's Mank, which earned her Golden Globe and Oscar nominations. She earned further critical acclaim in her performance as Theranos founder Elizabeth Holmes in the limited series The Dropout for which she won an Emmy Award for Outstanding Lead Actress and a nomination for a second Emmy for Outstanding Limited or Anthology Series as a producer of the show.

Public image

Seyfried has received numerous accolades from People magazine, which ranked her number one in a 2011 article featuring "25 Beauties (and Hotties) at 25"; she was also included in the magazine's annual beauty list in 2009 and 2010. She also appeared in the magazine's "Beautiful at Every Age" article in 2012. She was featured in Vanity Fair's "Bright Young Hollywood" article in 2008; and in 2010 appeared on the magazine's cover along with several other actresses.

In 2010, Seyfried was selected as brand's muse, ambassador and official spokesperson for French-Japanese luxury skincare house Clé de Peau Beauté. In May 2013, she was selected as the global face of Givenchy's Very Irresistible Fragrance. In June 2016, Seyfried became the global face of the Miu Miu's Fall Winter 2016 Collection Campaign, alongside Taylor Hill, Anna Ewers, Mayowa Nicholas, Rose Hanbury and more.

Seyfried has been brand ambassador for Swiss luxury watch brand Jaeger-LeCoultre since 2019 and was named as the global ambassador for Lancôme in October 2019.

Personal life
Seyfried has acknowledged suffering from anxiety, obsessive–compulsive disorder, and panic attacks. She also had stage fright, and largely for that reason, avoided performing in theater productions until 2015.

Seyfried was in a relationship with actor Dominic Cooper on and off from 2008 to 2009, and actor Justin Long from 2013 to 2015.  She also dated Dexter star Desmond Harrington from July 2012 to April 2013. 

In early 2016, she began a relationship with her co-star in The Last Word, Thomas Sadoski. They confirmed their engagement on September 12, 2016, and married in March 2017. They have two children, a daughter and a son.

Seyfried is a board member of the International Network for Aid, Relief and Assistance (INARA), which provides medical services for children wounded in war zones, with a special focus on refugee children from Syria impacted by the Syrian civil war.

Filmography

Film

Television

Discography

Awards and nominations

References

External links

 
 
 
 

Living people
1985 births
20th-century American actresses
21st-century American actresses
21st-century American singers
21st-century American women singers
Actresses from Allentown, Pennsylvania
American child actresses
American child models
American film actresses
American people of English descent
American people of German descent
American people of Scotch-Irish descent
American people of Welsh descent
American soap opera actresses
American sopranos
American television actresses
American voice actresses
American women singer-songwriters
Best Miniseries or Television Movie Actress Golden Globe winners
Musicians from Allentown, Pennsylvania
Outstanding Performance by a Lead Actress in a Miniseries or Movie Primetime Emmy Award winners
People with obsessive–compulsive disorder
Singer-songwriters from Pennsylvania
William Allen High School alumni